Veronika Gut (1757 - 1829) was a Swiss rebel heroine. She was a conservative farmer's wife and a leading political figure of the conservative rebel movement against the French occupation among the peasantry of Nidwalden, who met at her house and under her leadership.

Veronika Gut has been the subject of books, a play and gender studies. A street, a foundation, a station have been named after her.

References 
 Franz Joseph Gut: Der Überfall in Nidwalden im Jahr 1798 in seinen Ursachen und Folgen. Stans 1862; Neuauflage Kägiswil 1989.

1757 births
1829 deaths
19th-century Swiss people
Women in 19th-century warfare
Helvetic Republic